Luther Johnson (April 11, 1939 – December 25, 2022) was an American blues singer and guitarist, who performed under the name Luther "Guitar Junior" Johnson. He is not to be confused with Luther "Georgia Boy" Johnson, Luther "Houserocker" Johnson, or Lonnie "Guitar Junior" Brooks.

Career
Born in Itta Bena, Mississippi, Johnson moved to Chicago with his family in 1955. During the 1960s, he performed with Magic Sam. He performed in Muddy Waters' band from 1972 to 1980. In 1980, four of his songs were included in an anthology released by Alligator Records. That same year he appeared as a member of the Legendary Blues Band, backing John Lee Hooker in the movie The Blues Brothers.

Johnson moved to the East Coast and began fronting his own band, the Magic Rockers. His "Walkin' the Dog" was recorded live at the Montreux Festival's Blues Night. He won a Grammy Award in 1985 for Best Traditional Blues Album for his part in Blues Explosion. He recorded three albums released by Telarc Records: Slammin’ on the West Side (1996), Got to Find a Way (1998), and Talkin' About Soul (2001). He also performed on three albums by the Nighthawks.

Johnson lived in Antrim, New Hampshire for many years but moved to Florida in 2017. He died on December 25, 2022, at the age of 83 and is survived by his wife, Lottie.

Discography
Ma Bea's Rock (1975) (with Jimmy Johnson)
Luther's Blues (1977) 
I Changed (1979)
Doin’ the Sugar Too (1984)
I Want to Groove With You (1990)
It’s Good to be Me (1992)
Country Sugar Papa (1994)
 Slammin on the West Side (1996)
Got to Find a Way (1998)
Talkin' About Soul (2001)

References

External links
Centrestage.net biography
[ Allmusic biography]
Photograph of Luther Johnson

 

1939 births
2022 deaths
People from Itta Bena, Mississippi
American blues guitarists
American male guitarists
American blues singer-songwriters
Chicago blues musicians
American blues singers
Blues musicians from Mississippi
Grammy Award winners
Singer-songwriters from Illinois
Singer-songwriters from Mississippi
Guitarists from Illinois
Guitarists from Mississippi
20th-century American guitarists
20th-century American male musicians
Alligator Records artists
Black & Blue Records artists
American male singer-songwriters